Thomas Edward Robinson (11 February 1909 – 25 March 1982) was an English professional footballer who scored 37 goals in 121 appearances in the Football League playing mainly as an inside left for Birmingham, Blackpool, Chesterfield, Lincoln City, Northampton Town, Gillingham and Walsall.

Life and career
Thomas Edward Robinson was born on 11 February 1909 in Coalville, Leicestershire. He was the second son of Ernest Robinson, a coal miner, and his wife Gertrude Martha. He played local football for Coalville YMCA, Ibstock Town and Leicestershire Senior League club Whitwick Imperial before joining Loughborough Corinthians of the Midland League ahead of the 1927–28 season. He moved on to Gresley Rovers of the Birmingham Combination in March 1928, scored four goals on debut in a 10–0 win, and, after a trial in which he and Gresley team-mate George Haywood played for Birmingham's Combination side, both signed professional forms for the Football League First Division club in January 1929.

Robinson played for Birmingham, Blackpool, Chesterfield, Lincoln City, Northampton Town, Gillingham and Walsall, appearing in all four divisions of the Football League during the 1930s. He then returned to non-league football with Tunbridge Wells Rangers and Nuneaton Borough. He retired from the game during the Second World War.

Robinson died in Moira, Leicestershire, on 25 March 1982 at the age of 73.

References

1909 births
1982 deaths
People from Coalville
Footballers from Leicestershire
English footballers
Association football inside forwards
Whitwick Imperial F.C. players
Loughborough Corinthians F.C. players
Gresley F.C. players
Birmingham City F.C. players
Blackpool F.C. players
Chesterfield F.C. players
Lincoln City F.C. players
Northampton Town F.C. players
Gillingham F.C. players
Walsall F.C. players
Tunbridge Wells F.C. players
Nuneaton Borough F.C. players
Midland Football League players
English Football League players